The International Hearing Society also known as The National Hearing Aid Society  is a professional membership organization established in 1951 that represents hearing healthcare providers. Based in Livonia, Michigan, the IHS provides services worldwide, assisting consumers in locating qualified hearing aid specialists for testing hearing problems, selecting and fitting hearing devices, and providing support and repairs.  IHS sponsors courses in audioprosthology. It also operates a national "Hearing Aid Helpline" that provides informational resources on hearing loss and helps locate hearing aid specialists.

Notes

Hearing aids
Health care-related professional associations
International organizations based in the United States